The Treason Act 1766 (6 Geo.3 c.53) was an Act of the Parliament of Great Britain. The long title was "An Act for altering the Oath of Abjuration and the Assurance; and for amending so much of an Act of the Seventh Year of her late Majesty Queen Anne, intituled, An Act for the Improvement of the Union of the two Kingdoms, as, after the Time therein limited, requires the Delivery of certain Lists and Copies therein mentioned to Persons indicted of High Treason, or Misprision of Treason."

Sections 1 and 2 of the Act were concerned with the oath of abjuration. Section 3 of the Act disapplied certain procedural requirements in cases of high treason consisting of counterfeiting the king's coin; namely the requirement that the accused be given a list of the witnesses and the jurors. (This requirement had only come into force in 1766, on the death of James Francis Edward Stuart, the Jacobite pretender to the throne.)

It was repealed on 15 June 1945.

See also
High treason in the United Kingdom
Treason Act

References

Great Britain Acts of Parliament 1766
Treason in the United Kingdom
Repealed Great Britain Acts of Parliament